Douglas Koch is a Canadian cinematographer who has won honours at the Canadian Screen Awards and Canadian Music Video Awards.

Koch is from Vancouver and studied film at Ryerson Polytechnical Institute in Toronto, finishing in 1983.  He went on to shoot music videos for artists such as Anne Murray and Sarah McLachlan, winning a cinematography award at the MuchMusic Video Awards in 1994 for "And if Venice Is Sinking".

He was nominated for the Genie Award for Best Cinematography for I've Heard the Mermaids Singing (1987) and Last Night (1998), as well as for the Canadian Society of Cinematographers Award for Best Cinematography in a Theatrical Feature for Last Night. In 2015, he won the Canadian Screen Award for Best Photography in a Comedy Program or Series for HBO Canada and Bell Media's episode "The Three Sisters" in the TV series Sensitive Skin. He was nominated for the Canadian Society of Cinematographers Award for Theatrical Feature Cinematography for the 2018 Through Black Spruce.

References

External links
 

Canadian cinematographers
Canadian Screen Award winners
Living people
People from Vancouver
Toronto Metropolitan University alumni
Year of birth missing (living people)